Arshad Ali may refer to:

 Arshad Ali (cricketer) (born 1976), Pakistani–Emirati cricket player
 Arshad Ali (Pakistani politician), Pakistani politician
 Arshad Ali (UK politician), British politician

See also
 Arshad Ali Chaudhry (1950–2015), Pakistani field hockey player
 Arshad Ali Khan (born 1984), Indian classical singer
 Ali Arshad Mir (1951–2008), Punjabi poet and writer